Brandon Gerrod Miller (born January 21, 1986) is a former American football defensive end. He was signed by the Atlanta Falcons as an undrafted free agent in 2008. He played college football at Georgia.

He has also played for the Seattle Seahawks.

Early years 
Attended  Miller County High School and as a senior he made 106 tackles and 27 receptions for more than 500 yards.

College career 
Miller played in 37 career games with 15 starts at linebacker for Georgia, posting 73 tackles and 6.0 sacks in his Bulldog career. In 2007, he appeared in 11 games making seven starts and in 2006 he appeared in every game with five starts and made 23 tackles with 2 PBU and 3 QB-Pressures. In 2005, he made his first career start against Boise State in the 2005 opener and started 10 games during season despite being hampered by injuries The prior season, 2004, he played in all 12 games with nine tackles and one fumble recovery.

Professional career

Atlanta Falcons
He was signed by the Atlanta Falcons as an undrafted free agent in 2008. He spent the first 10 weeks of the regular season on the team's practice squad before being promoted to the active roster on November 16. He was waived two days later.

Seattle Seahawks
Miller was claimed off waivers by the Seattle Seahawks on November 19, 2008. He appeared in one game for the Seahawks during the 2008 season, recording one tackle.

Miller was waived/injured by the Seahawks on July 29 and subsequently reverted to the team's injured reserve list.  On May 13, 2010, Miller was released by the Seahawks.

External links
Georgia Bulldogs bio
Seattle Seahawks bio

1986 births
Living people
People from Colquitt, Georgia
American football defensive ends
American football linebackers
Georgia Bulldogs football players
Atlanta Falcons players
Seattle Seahawks players